Grand Army of the Republic Memorial may refer to:

Stephenson Grand Army of the Republic Memorial, Washington, D.C.
Grand Army of the Republic Memorial (Judsonia, Arkansas), listed on the National Register of Historic Places in White County, Arkansas
Grand Army of the Republic Memorial (Siloam Springs, Arkansas), listed on the National Register of Historic Places in Benton County, Arkansas

See also
Grand Army of the Republic
List of memorials to the Grand Army of the Republic
Grand Army of the Republic Hall (disambiguation)
Grand Army of the Republic Cemetery (Portland, Oregon)
Grand Army of the Republic Cemetery (Seattle)

Architectural disambiguation pages